Doğukan Emeksiz (born 5 January 2000) is a Turkish professional footballer who plays as a winger for TFF First League club Yeni Malatyaspor.

Professional career
Emeksiz began his career with Sarıyer in the Second League before transferring to Yeni Malatyaspor on 1 September 2020. On 24 January 2021, Emeksiz made his professional debut in a 1-0 Süper Lig loss to Galatasaray.

References

External links
 
 

2000 births
People from Istanbul Province
Living people
Turkish footballers
Association football wingers
Sarıyer S.K. footballers
Yeni Malatyaspor footballers
Süper Lig players
TFF First League players
TFF Second League players